Borowski Peak is a small but distinctive peak,  high, located  southwest of Rand Peak in the Nebraska Peaks, Britannia Range. It was named by the Advisory Committee on Antarctic Names after D. Borowski, a member of the United States Antarctic Research Program geophysical party, Ross Ice Shelf Project, 1974–75 field season.

References 

Mountains of Oates Land